Bisanadi National Reserve is a wildlife reserve in Isiolo County, Kenya. It is adjacent to Meru National Park. The park is home to the lion, African elephant, cheetah, white rhinoceros, and African buffalo and over 400 species of birds. Visitors to the reserve can boat/fish on the Tana and Rojewero rivers.

References

Protected areas of Kenya